This is a list of Major League Baseball players who have compiled 1,000 runs batted in (RBIs). RBIs are usually accumulated when a batter in baseball enables a runner on base (including himself, in the case of a home run) to score as a result of making contact at-bat (except in certain situations, such as when an error is made on the play or during a double play). A batter is also credited with an RBI if he reaches first base with the bases loaded via a base on balls (walk), being hit by a pitch, or interference. 

As of 2023, Miguel Cabrera is the only active player among the top 15 in career RBIs. 

MLB's official list does not include RBIs accumulated before 1920, when runs batted in became an official statistic. The list on this page is compiled from Baseball-Reference, which credits RBIs from 1907 to 1919 as recorded by baseball writer and historian Ernest Lanigan. One difference between the lists is that Babe Ruth is ranked third by Baseball-Reference, but seventh by MLB, which does not count Ruth's 224 RBI compiled before 1920.

Key

List
Stats updated through the 2022 season.

Through the 2022 season, these are the active players with at least 850 RBIs.

Giancarlo Stanton (971) 78 in 2022
Nolan Arenado (968) 103 in 2022
Carlos Santana (925) 60 in 2022
J.D. Martinez (899) 62 in 2022
Mike Trout (896) 80 in 2022
Anthony Rizzo (889) 75 in 2022
Eric Hosmer (879) 44 in 2022
José Abreu (863) 75 in 2022
Manny Machado (853) 102 in 2022

Notes

References

External links

MLB official list
Major League Baseball ESPN

Major League Baseball statistics
Runs batted